The redside shiner (Richardsonius balteatus) is a species of cyprinid fish found in the western United States and Canada.

References
 

Richardsonius
Cyprinid fish of North America
Fish of Canada
Fish of the United States
Fish described in 1836
Taxa named by John Richardson (naturalist)